Butterflies Are Free is a 1972 American comedy-drama film based on the 1969 play by Leonard Gershe. The 1972 film was produced by M. J. Frankovich, released by Columbia Pictures, directed by Milton Katselas and adapted for the screen by Gershe. It was released on July 6, 1972, in the U.S. The film is about a woman, Jill Tanner, who moves into an apartment beside a blind man, Don Baker, who has recently moved out on his own. The two become attracted to each other, and combine the divided apartment into one, but Don's mother tries to end the romance, fearing that Jill will break her son's heart.

Goldie Hawn and Edward Albert starred. Eileen Heckart received an Academy Award for her performance. While the original play was set in East Village, Manhattan, the screenplay written for the 1972 film was set in the 1355, 1355A, 1357, 1359 Grant Avenue building in North Beach, San Francisco.

Plot
In San Francisco of the early 1970s, Don Baker, who was born blind, has lived all his life with his mother. When Don was young, Mrs. Baker wrote a series of popular children's books about Little Donny Dark, a blind boy who performs heroic deeds. Don moves into an apartment on his own, but finds himself all alone. He has made a contract that his mother will not come to see him for at least two months.

One month has passed. This is when Jill Tanner moves into an adjoining apartment. She listens to Don talking to his mother over the phone and turns on the radio. When Don asks her to turn the volume down, she invites herself over for a cup of coffee. They start talking and find each other friendly. Jill does not realize that Don is blind until she sees him dropping his cigarette ash on the table. Jill has never met a blind man before, so she asks all sorts of questions about how Don manages everyday chores.

Jill tells Don that her favorite quote is: "I only ask to be free. The butterflies are free. Mankind will surely not deny to Harold Skimpole what it concedes to the butterflies." (From Dickens' Bleak House.) She takes him to Asparagus, a bohemian clothing store, on Union Street, where owner Roy helps them pick out some free-spirited fashion. Back home, Don makes up a song and starts to sing "Butterflies Are Free" on his guitar. They discover they can unlock the door separating their two apartments.

Surprising Don with a visit, Mrs. Baker sees that Don has attached himself to Jill. She also encounters them in the apartment partially undressed. She fears that Jill will break Don's heart. She takes Jill out for a lunch at Perry's, on Union Street, and tries to talk her out of Don's life. Jill has strong feelings for Don and tells Mrs. Baker that if there is someone who should get out of Don's life, it is she.

Following Mrs. Baker's input, Jill later breaks a dinner date at Don's apartment, showing up much later with Ralph, the director of the play she has auditioned for. Jill hesitantly announces that she is moving in with Ralph, trying too hard to convince Don, and herself, that it is a great idea.

When Jill goes to pack her things, a heartbroken Don asks his mother if he can move back home. She talks him out of it, pointing out that her Little Donny Dark books had been her way of helping young Don face his fears, and she (sadly) must do the same now. They finally make peace over their new roles in life. Jill and Don fight over her moving out, and Don tells her she is the one who is disabled. She leaves but returns to Don, and the two reconcile.

Cast
 
 Goldie Hawn as Jill Tanner
 Edward Albert as Don Baker
 Eileen Heckart as Mrs. Baker
 Michael Glaser as Ralph Santori
 Michael Warren as Roy

Reception
Variety wrote: "Although the setting has been changed from New York to San Francisco for no apparent reason, Leonard Gershe's screen adaptation of his successful Broadway play ... is an excellent example of how to switch from one medium to another without sacrificing any of the qualities which makes the original version such a success." The review further praises the acting of Goldie Hawn, saying: "Miss Hawn, funny and touching, is a delight throughout and Miss Heckart finally gets another film role that enables her to display the versatility that has been evident for a long time in her stage roles."

Vincent Canby of The New York Times wrote: "The film is not completely without intelligence, but its intelligence is in the service of the kind of sentimentality that shrivels the mind, like something left in water too long."

Charles Champlin of the Los Angeles Times wrote that "a very well-made commercial play—funny, sentimental, positive, tight—has become a well-made commercial movie—light, bright, extremely well and personably acted, and preserving the intimacy and the unity which were the virtues of the play."

Gene Siskel of the Chicago Tribune gave the film three stars out of four and wrote that "one of the attractive aspects of Butterflies Are Free is that each of the three characters is incomplete and flawed. To that degree the Leonard Gershe screenplay approaches believability, and this is a rare quality for a tear-jerker to have."

Gary Arnold of The Washington Post stated "While the material is essentially shallow and often insufferable in its sentimental opportunism, Gershe and Katselas demonstrate some theatrical talent and mechanical aptitude ... The play itself is nothing to brag about, but I doubt if one could transpose it much more adroitly and presentably. Instead of inflating or vulgarising this frail property, Katselas tries to keep it intimate and engaging."

John Gillett of The Monthly Film Bulletin wrote "Occasionally it is all rather twee, plumping for the easy emotional response and the easy tear; yet much of the writing has sharpness and bite, notably in the initial meetings between Jill and Don, when they talk out their pasts together and improvise meals on the floor."

Time pointed out the talent of Goldie Hawn, stating: "Goldie Hawn, as the girl next door, has come a long way from her giddy role in Laugh-In; she is often genuinely touching." Time praised the acting of both Edward Albert and Eileen Heckart: "Edward Albert, the son of Actor Edward Albert, is creditable as the blind boy, and Eileen Heckart is appropriately hateful as the mother, although she is unable to be convincing in her transformation. But then nobody could be."

The film holds a score of 67% on Rotten Tomatoes, based on 12 reviews.

The film was rated in M in New Zealand and Australia where it was previously rated PG.

Awards and honors

The film is recognized by American Film Institute in these lists:
 2002: AFI's 100 Years...100 Passions – Nominated

See also
 List of American films of 1972

References

External links
 
 
 
 
 Butterflies Are Free, full movie on Youtube

1972 romantic comedy films
1972 films
American romantic comedy films
Columbia Pictures films
1970s English-language films
Films about blind people
American films based on plays
Films featuring a Best Supporting Actress Academy Award-winning performance
Films set in San Francisco
Films directed by Milton Katselas
1970s American films